C'est la guerre may refer to:

C'est la guerre!, a French expression meaning "that's war"
C'est La Guerre, a racehorse
C'est la guerre (opera), an opera by